The Norman Mailer Prize or Mailer Prize is an American literary award established in 2009 by The Norman Mailer Center and The Norman Mailer Writers Colony to celebrate writers and their works. Norman Mailer was a 20th-century American author. Prizes were given in the years 2009–2015.

Honorees

2009
Lifetime Achievement: Toni Morrison
Distinguished Journalism: David Halberstam

2010
Lifetime Achievement: Orhan Pamuk
Lifetime Achievement in Magazine Publishing: Jann Wenner
Distinguished Journalism and Humanitarianism: Ruth Gruber

2011
Lifetime Achievement: Elie Wiesel
Distinguished Writing: Arundhati Roy
Distinguished Journalism: Gay Talese
Biography: Keith Richards, Life

2012
Lifetime Achievement: Joyce Carol Oates
Distinguished Publishing: Barnet Lee Rosset, Jr.
Biography: Robert A. Caro

2013
Lifetime Achievement: Maya Angelou
Distinguished Writing: Junot Diaz
Distinguished Journalism: Michael Hastings

2014
Lifetime Achievement: Don DeLillo
Distinguished Magazine Publishing: Katrina vanden Heuvel
Distinguished Poetry: Billy Collins

2015
Lifetime Achievement: Salman Rushdie

2016 
 (no prize)

References

External links
The Mailer Prize, official website.

American literary awards
Awards established in 2009
Literary awards honoring lifetime achievement
Literary awards honouring young writers